Alex Berger (born ) is a producer, creator, consultant and entrepreneur in the media field. During his professional life, he created or participated in numerous, films , TV shows (Rapido, Burger Quiz...), digital (invented the multi-access portal for Vivendi-Vodafone) and founded or accelerated the growth of several companies (NBdC, Canal+, TOP-The Oligarchs Productions...) by holding various key positions such as senior Vice President and head of strategy to Pierre Lescure at Canal+ , CEO of CanalNumedia, co-CEO at VivendiNet (Groupe Vivendi-Universal), President of MM&I (consulting) as co-founder, President and CEO of TOG-The Oligarchs Group and TOP-The Oligarchs Productions.

Biography

Childhood and family
He was born March 22, 1962, in Philadelphia in the US. He is the son of Francine Dreyfus-Berger, a French painter and Dr. Joseph Berger, PhD. 
In 1972, he moved to France with his parents and his sister Sylvie Berger. After a French schooling, he briefly studied at the University of Pennsylvania, then lived between the US and Europe.
He currently lives in Paris, with his wife  and their three children.

Career

His start at RMC-TMC 
His career started in 1982 at TMC TMC owned at the time by the Principality of Monaco. Michel Lacroix, head of programming and general manager hired him as an intern. After a few months and after coordinating the international feed for the funeral of late Princess Grace of Monaco, Jean-Claude Heberlé then CEO of RMC-TMC appointed him producer of the RMC-TMC evening news flash, at 21. Alex Berger worked on several innovative productions at TMC. It was while working at TMC that he met Alain Chabat ( a radio host on RMC at the time).

Real to Reel Filmworks, Inc & Revell 
He left Monaco in 1984 and founded his first production company, Real to Reel Filmworks, Inc. in Los Angeles with the Baron Edmond de Rothschild & his son Benjamin de Rothschild. This company produced short programs for the rising cable industry in the US. Reel to Real participated in one of the first American animation shows based on a toy line (Robotech) for Revell Toys (the American subsidiary of  - CEJI owned then by the Rothschilds). The animation series Robotech was syndicated throughout the US and sold worldwide. Robotech was produced by Harmony Gold USA.

Banque Privée Edmond de Rothschild 
After selling Real to Reel, Inc, Alex Berger went back to Europe to join the banking and financial sector at Banque privée Edmond de Rothschild in Geneva as a financial analyst for media and communication as well as managing some of Baron de Rothschilds media assets and consulting for the LEICOM fund.

NBdC (Newman, Berger, de Caunes) 
18 months later, in 1986, he returned to Paris, France and founded NBdC with partners Tim Newman and Antoine de Caunes.  NBdC rapidly became one of the leading independent production companies in France specialised in young adult television shows. NBdC notably produced:

Rock Report on Antenne 2, a weekly music magazine part of  presented by Antoine de Caunes
Rapido, a weekly music and culture magazine hosted by Antoine de Caunes and sold throughout Europe. It won several awards for its rapid pace editing (Peter Stuart/ Pascal Mercier), graphics and opening titles created by Jean-Baptiste Mondino and on the edge reports. 
Rapido had three broadcast lives: first on TF1 as a weekly 52-minute show, then on Canal + in a 26-minute format, and in 14 other versions internationally. The show had been noticed by Jane Porter and Alan Yentob who decided to buy the format with Antoine de Caunes as its star host on BBC1 between 1988 and 19911

Le glaive et la balance on M6, presented by Charles Villeneuve and co-produced by Série Limitée.
Merci et encore bravo (Antenne 2), Arthur Emission Impossible (TF1), le meilleur du pire (Canal Jimmy).

NBdC also produced documentary series (Génération 90, on Antenne 2, variety shows and specials, video clips (« Precious Thing » by Dee Dee Bridgewater and Ray Charles; « Goodbye Marylou » by Michel Polnareff; « Toi mon toit » by Elli Medeiros and over 200 others for various artists such as Johnny Hallyday). NBdC also produced commercials ( France Télécom, Actifed...) and corporate shows (Leroy Merlin, Carrefour, EMI, Philips...)
NBdC was also active in digital design ( M6 / Coca-Cola, VideoMusic, Channel4...).

The U.K. RAPIDO TV 
In 1989, capitalising the notorious success of the shows produced in France by NBdC, Alex Berger and his partners created Rapido TV in Great Britain. Rapido TV was a 50/50 joint venture with Richard Branson / Virgin Communications, managed by the prolific producer Peter Stuart. 
Rapido TV quickly became a successful provider of TV shows, also aimed towards the niche young adult segment created through NBdC. As for NBdC in France and elsewhere in Europe, Rapido TV established a distinctive tone, rhythm and style that turned TV shows into brands.

Eurotrash with Antoine de Caunes and Jean-Paul Gaultier on Channel4;
Passengers. 
Around the world in 80 raves, 
Baadasss TV presented by Ice-T, 
The Girly Show, 
Unzipped, 
Carnal Knowledge...

Scripted drama with Is Harry on the Boat? and documentaries Fortean TV, Channel Hopping, ‘Dying to be beautiful’, Unpeeled, Gérard Depardieu: the ugly frog that became a prince, Brigitte Bardot: the reluctant goddess, and Serge Gainsbourg: France's secret vice, Naked City, Graham Norton's Rock Babylon...).

Career at Canal + 
As an advisor to the chairman and CEO he participated in the creation of MultiThématiques S.A. that held the initial cable channels Planète (documentaries), Jimmy (series and lifestyle), CinéCinéma, Cinéfil (the classic and second run movie channels). With Michel Thoulouze he elaborated the strategy and negotiated with TCI International to sell the US cable giant (now Liberty Media) to take a 34% stake and fund the international expansion of the core 4 French channels into 40 international services.
November the 4th 1994, he was nominated Executive Vice President and special advisor to the CEO of the Groupe Canal+, Pierre Lescure.

It that position and as a member of the strategic and executive committees that he was directly involved in the strategy of every major development of the group between 1994 and 2000, such as

Acquisition of Nethold and TelePiu in Italy and creation of the Canal+ entities in Europe, Canal International (15 million subscribers from Portugal to Scandinavia)
Development of CanalSatellite, first interactive digital satellite platform in the world
Creation of Canal Technologies and its two core products: interactive television module and encrypted controlled access

Creation of StudioCanal after the acquisition of several American and European film catalogues thus becoming one biggest catalogues in Europe
The negotiations with all US major studios for the Group's output deals. Alex Berger became the point person for all of Canal+ Group's US endeavours, relationships and partnerships notably with Warner, Fox, Disney, Sony and Universal.

Invention of Vizzavi 
In 1997, Alex Berger invents the multi-access web portal Vizzavi, which consists of enabling premium content to travel seamlessly between all of the subscribers and their services and devices ( Canal+ pay TV and CanalSatellite pay channels, AOL Europe subscribers, SFR mobile subscribers, Numéricâble subscribers.)... This system named Vizzavi, was co-owned by Vodafone under the name Vodafone Live. service.

CanalNumedia & VivendiNet 
In 1998, Alex Berger founded and became the first CEO of CanalNumedia. CanalNumedia all the gaming activities of the group (2nd worldwide) and football, cinema and photography sites... In 1999 he founded and became the co-CEO of Vivendi Universal Net (VivendiNet) along with Franck Boulben.
VivendiNet regrouped all digital contents of:

•Canal+/CanalNumedia (sports and cinema websites and Allociné), 
•Havas with all of its publications and digital assets such as Scoot, bonjour !, 01.net, la Vie Financière
•  (SFR) and Vizzavi
•as well as all the venture capital funds (Viventures) and the incubator @VISO co-owned 50/50 with SOFTBANK.

Vivendi, Universal & Canal+ merge 
Alex Berger was a member of the strategic committees of both Canal+ and Vivendi.
At the beginning of 2000, following the announcement of the merger between AOL and Time Warner, Alex Berger understood the necessity of having an offensive strategy to counter the US studio strategy of directly linking content with end users, therefore, disintermediating Canal+ and Vivendi groups as local distributors.

Once approved by Jean Marie Messier and Pierre Lescure, Alex Berger initiated the discussions with Universal. With the help of Terry Semel, former CEO of Warner Brothers, they approached Edgar Bronfman Jr, CEO of Seagram, owned by Universal. This strategy led to Vivendi, Universal and Canal+ to merge in June 2000.

After the merger was finalised in June 2000, Alex Berger was at a strategic position between Vivendi-Universal CEO Jean-Marie Messier and Canal+ Group CEO Pierre Lescure, head of content and digital. Internal politics and infighting raging, Alex Berger decided to leave Canal+ group in September 2000.

Content Participations 
At the end of 2000, Alex Berger decided to go back to his entrepreneur beginnings and founded two companies: Content Participations et MM&I.
Content Participations invested in companies that produced and owned content and helped in crystallizing their strategy and accelerate their growth: TV, films, web, music publishing, print and online publishing, gaming... Content Participations was both investor and advisor for these companies:

 (Alain Chabat) co-producer or producer of Astérix et Obélix : Mission Cléopatre, RRRrrrr!!!, Prète-moi ta main, Burger Quiz,  and Wam Films USA with "A thousand Words" (Focus Films) 
Source Films (Sébastien Fechner) producer of 
Ardimages (Thierry Ardisson)
Bikini Films (Thomas Sorriaux, Sandrine Paquot and )
Script Associés (Laurent Zeitoun)
And also to A7 Music, Insitu Systems, Realty Gaming, Inc; Intermix (MySpace), Mania Entertainment

Alex Berger left his position of CEO of Content Participations in June 2006 when the company was taken over by EBR Finances Groupe Edmond de Rothschild.

MM&I 
MM&I (Me, Myself and I) is a consulting company for development and innovation strategy in the media field. Some of its clients were: Yahoo!, Philips, Sanoma, France24, 365 Media, LVMH group (Henessy, Ruinart, Veuve Cliquot, Moët&Chandon...), SELL (French gaming association) as well as some individuals, investment funds and governmental institutions. MM&I, is also a program syndicator through the label Entjoy.
Via MM&I and personally, Alex Berger has been a board member for a number of companies such as UK Betting.

TOP - The Oligarchs Productions 
Alex Berger & Eric Rochant are partners in The Oligarchs Productions since 2008. 
TOP is a production company based in Paris, developing scripted drama series in French as well as in English.

The company name came from the first TV series they developed together, The Oligarchs. TOP-The Oligarchs Productions is the production company behind Le Bureau des Légendes/The Bureau, a show created by Eric Rochant. The Bureau is distributed by Federation Entertainment and diffused by Canal + in France. In 2018, The Bureau was one of the most exported French TV shows.

Le Bureau des Légendes/The Bureau is both a critical and commercial success: 
Federation Entertainment has indicated that Le Bureau des Légendes was sold in over 100 markets as of 2019 becoming one of France's all-time leading exports in scripted drama. 
Le Bureau des Légendes is still one of the leading franchise series on Canal+ in France.

Some of the distinctions are:

Season 1

Seriesmania :
Special Jury Prize,
Best Actor - Mathieu Kassovitz

Association des Critiques de Séries:
Best Series,
Best Actor - Mathieu Kassovitz

Prix du Syndicat Français de la critique:
Best Series

Season 2

Colcoa Festival:
Jury Special Award,
Best Series Audience Award, 
Best Series

Télérama :
Top 10 Series 2016 : N°1
 
Lauriers de l’Audiovisuel:
Best Series

Globes de Cristal:
Best Series

Le Parisien:
Etoile de la série Française (2016)

Association des Critiques de Séries:
Best Producer

Season 3

Association des Critiques de Séries:
Best Series,
Best Screenplay

Season 4

Télérama: 
Top 10 Series 2018 : N°1

Globes de Cristal:
3 Nominations (Best Series, Best Actor, Best Actress)

Season 5

TV France International: 
Export Award 2020

Grand Prix Des Médias:
Best Series

The success of this show is twofold: one the creative talent of Eric Rochant and the way he reinvented the spy genre with an ultra-realistic take. Two, as TOP implemented a very distinctive and unique method of development and production for France. 
To produce a season of 10x52’ every 12 to 15 months Alex Berger and Eric Rochant adapted US development and production methods as implemented by the WGA for decades to the French environment of droit d’auteur (authors rights and collective management system as well as to the French labor laws). Eric Rochant is, therefore, the showrunner under this industrial system that is detailed below and in the report that Alex Berger delivered to the CNC in April 2019.

The method created and developed by Alex Berger and Eric Rochant put the writing at the heart of the creative process.
The authors of Le Bureau des Légendes are:
Season 1: Éric Rochant, Camille De Castelnau, Emmanuel Bourdieu, Cécile Ducrocq

Season 2: Eric Rochant, Camille De Castelnau, Raphaël Chevènement, Cécile Ducrocq, Hippolyte Girardot, Antonin Martin Hilbert

Season 3: Éric Rochant, Camille De Castelnau, Raphaël Chevènement, Cécile Ducrocq, Emmanuel Bourdieu, 
With the collaboration De Capucine Rochant

Season 4: Éric Rochant, Cécile Ducrocq, Vincent Mariette, Capucine Rochant, Gaëlle Bellan, Camille De Castelnau, Claire Lemaréchal, Quoc Dang Tran, Raphaël Chevènement, Joëlle Touma, Olivier Dujols, Dominique Baumard

Season 5: Éric Rochant, Jacques Audiard, Thomas Bidegain, Cécile Ducrocq, Capucine Rochant, Hippolyte Girardot, Dominique Baumard, Camille de Castelnau, Olivier Dujols, Raphaël Chevènement, with the collaboration of Valentine Milville

The main actors of the show are, Mathieu Kassovitz, Mathieu Amalric, Sara Giraudeau, Léa Drucker, Florence Loiret-Caille, Jonathan Zaccai, Jean-Pierre Darroussin, Artus Solaro, Zineb Triki, Pauline Etienne, Mathieu Demy, Alba Gaïa Kraghede Bellugi...

Berger Report (2019) 
On a new organisation for scripted drama series in France

Alex Berger was asked to write a report for the CNC (Centre National du Cinéma et de l’Image Animée- French National Center for Cinema and Animation) on a new organisation of scripted drama in France. 
The report was commissioned by the CNC to show what and how should be changed in the French market to meet the standards as well as needs in this golden age of scripted drama. The report puts in perspective the changes that need to be made within paradigm shift with the rise of the digital platforms, and how this affects the way of developing, producing and distributing TV series, taking Le Bureau des Légendes/The Bureau as an example.

https://www.cnc.fr/documents/36995/976401/Rapport+Berger+sur+une+nouvelle+organisation+de+la+fiction+s%C3%A9rielle+en+France.pdf/9737716b-6a6a-7537-8a41-e31100a75be9

Television appearance 
With the humoristic group Les Nuls as a guest on the set, he made a parody of one of them, Dominique Farrugia

Cinema appearance 
Alex Berger interpreted the character of Caius Tchounus Mogulus, in Astérix et Obélix: Mission Cléopâtre of Alain Chabat.

References

Further reading
 Profile et background sur le site Bloomberg Business Week
 Interview de Alex Berger, sur le site du Journal du Net, pour la création de Canal New Media, août 1999.
 Article "BSkyB and Canal Plus snuggle closer for joint European push", par Simon Bond sur le site de Media Life Magazine, octobre 1999
 Résumé de l'atelier sur les programmes courts, qui s'est tenu à Kuala Lumpur en Malaisie, en avril 2010, et auquel Alex Berger a participé.
 Histoire de désirs, de Pierre Lescure et Jean-Pierre Lavoignat, octobre 2001
 The Man Who Tried to Buy the World: Jean-Marie Messier and Vivendi Universal, de Jo Johnson et Martine Orange, janvier 2004

1962 births
Living people
French businesspeople
French television producers
French film producers